The 1973 Austrian Grand Prix was a Formula One motor race held at Österreichring on 19 August 1973. It was race 12 of 15 in both the 1973 World Championship of Drivers and the 1973 International Cup for Formula One Manufacturers.

The 54-lap race was won by Swedish driver Ronnie Peterson, driving a Lotus-Ford, after he started from second position. Scotland's Jackie Stewart achieved his final podium finish, coming second in his Tyrrell-Ford, while Brazil's Carlos Pace achieved his first, coming third in a Surtees-Ford.

Niki Lauda was forced to miss his home race after breaking his wrist at the Nürburgring two weeks previously. BRM did not replace him for the event.

Qualifying

Qualifying classification

Race

Classification

Championship standings after the race

Drivers' Championship standings

Constructors' Championship standings

References

Austrian Grand Prix
Grand Prix
Austrian Grand Prix